Striker is a 2010 Indian Hindi-language action drama film written, directed and produced by Chandan Arora. It stars Siddharth, Usha Jadhav, and Padmapriya in the lead roles, while Aditya Pancholi, Ankur Vikal, Anupam Kher, Seema Biswas, and Anup Soni, among others, play supporting roles. The film had a theatrical release in cinemas throughout India on 5 February 2010. It also premiered on YouTube the same day, thus becoming the first ever Indian film to premiere on YouTube internationally on the same day as its domestic theatrical release.

Plot 
Born into a poor family, Suryakant Sarang grows up with few luxuries. Poor health keeps him away from school often, and that is when his elder brother, Chandrakant, introduces him to carrom. Winning the Junior Carrom Championship at 12 is not enough to keep Surya's fire for the sport burning through adolescence. Hopes for a job in Dubai replace the passion for carrom as Surya grows into a young man. Duped by a bogus overseas employment agency, Surya loses all his hard-earned money he had saved for going to Dubai. Surya is forced to cross paths with Jaleel. Since the 70's when the settlements in the ghetto began, Jaleel had acquired a strong hold in the area. He had his hands in every illicit activity since then. Feeding on the weaknesses of people, Jaleel was the self-proclaimed king of Malwani. Reintroduced to carrom by his childhood friend Zaid, this time to the carrom hustling scene, Surya starts playing again. Being cheated of his hard-earned money by the same man who had caused misery for many families, Surya decides to take on Jaleel on his turf. His patience and cool attitude are his biggest strengths, but life has its own ways of testing it.

Cast 
 Siddharth as Suryakant Sarang
 Usha Jadhav as Rajni
 Padmapriya as Madhu
 Aditya Pancholi as Jaleel (local crime boss)
 Ankur Vikal as Zaid
 Anupam Kher as Inspector Farooque
 Seema Biswas as Surya's mother
 Anup Soni as Chandrakant Sarang
 Vidya Malvade as Devi Sarang
 Nicolette Bird as Noorie
 Bhavya Gandhi as young Suryakant

Soundtrack

The soundtrack album of Striker consists of 8 songs composed by various artists such as Vishal Bhardwaj, noted Tamil composer Yuvan Shankar Raja in his Bollywood debut, Amit Trivedi, rapper Blaaze, Shailendra Barve and lyricist-singer Swanand Kirkire, whilst lyrics are penned by Nitin Raikwar, Blaaze, Prashant Ingole, Jeetendra Joshi, Swanand Kirkire and Gulzar. Shri was the music producer and composed the original soundtrack. The album was released on 12 January 2010.

Release 
Sukanya Varma of Rediff gave the film a rating of three out of five stars and opined that "An interesting film with a lot on its mind, Striker isn't comfort cinema but I will recommend it anyway". A critic from The Times of India gave the film the same rating and wrote that "Don't believe the lacklustre promos. The film has more meat -- and meaning -- than it promises". Sanjukta Sharma of Livemint gave the film a positive review and stated that "Striker is one of the good films of the year so far. It is not a breezy film or a candyfloss entertainer, but it’s surely an example of committed and adept film-making. There’s never enough of it".

References

External links
 
 Striker at Sulekha

2010 films
2010s Hindi-language films
2010 action drama films
2010 crime drama films
Indian action drama films
Indian crime drama films
Viacom18 Studios films
Films scored by Yuvan Shankar Raja
Films scored by Vishal Bhardwaj
Films scored by Amit Trivedi
Films scored by Swanand Kirkire
Films scored by Blaaze